The Church of Saint Emerentiana on Tor Fiorenza is a Roman Catholic titular church in Rome, built as a parish church, by decree of Cardinal Francesco Marchetti Selvaggiani. It is named for Saint Emerentiana, a 4th century martyr. On 5 March 1973 Pope Paul VI granted it a titular church as a seat for Cardinals.

At present the Titulus Sancta Emerentianae ad locum vulgo Tor Fiorenza is held by Jean-Pierre Kutwa.

Architecture 

The facade has three doors which are framed by travertine marble. The church has three naves separated by pillars, with six side chapels. The apse is dominated by a large mosaic depicting the Triumph of the Church, by the Franciscan Belluno Ugolino.

List of Cardinal Priests 
 José Salazar López (5 March 1973 – 9 July 1991)
 Peter Seiichi Shirayanagi (26 November 1994 – 30 December 2009)
 Medardo Joseph Mazombwe (20 November 2010 – 29 August 2013)
 Jean-Pierre Kutwa (22 February 2014 - incumbent)

References

 C. Rendina, Le Chiese di Roma, Newton & Compton Editori, Milano 2000
 G. Carpaneto, Quartiere XVII. Trieste, in AA.VV, I quartieri di Roma, Newton & Compton Editori, Roma 2006

Titular churches
20th-century Roman Catholic church buildings in Italy
Rome Q. XVII Trieste